The Recognition of Trusts Act 1987 is a UK Act of Parliament that requires and entitles that courts in the United Kingdom recognise the validity of trusts which are created abroad.

The Act implemented the Hague Trust Convention, agreed internationally in 1985. It has recently come under scrutiny for the propensity to perpetuate tax avoidance, and the shift of vast sums of money to offshore tax havens.

Contents
Schedule 1, article 6, states the settlor of a trust has the right to choose any foreign trust law to govern a trust. Art 18 goes on to say that provisions of the schedule are inapplicable if it would be ‘manifestly incompatible with public policy’.

See also
English trust law
UK company law

English trusts law